Oren was the codename assigned to a Baltic-German double agent in South-East Asia by British Intelligence during World War I.

Identity
Although his true identity is unknown, he is believed to be a man of Swedish descent.  Author Nigel West states that he was a Baltic German.

Espionage
Oren also passed on information on the operations of Jatindranath Mukherjee's agent Narendranath Bhattacharya with German ministers in South-East Asia, and of Jatin's plans for revolt in the Indian Army in Bengal in August 1915.

Based on Oren's intelligence, the Maverick was seized.  Meanwhile in India, police destroyed the underground movement in Calcutta as an unaware Jatin proceeded according to plan to the Bay of Bengal coast in Balasore.  He was followed there by Indian police and on 9 September 1915, he and a group of five revolutionaries armed with Mauser pistols made a last stand on the banks of the river Burha Balang.  Seriously wounded in a gun battle that lasted seventy five minutes, Jatin died the next day in the town of Balasore. 

Oren's true identity was never disclosed by Beckett.

References

Footnotes

Notations
 
 
 
 

World War I spies for the United Kingdom
Double agents
Hindu–German Conspiracy
Revolutionary movement for Indian independence
Year of birth missing
Year of death missing
World War I spies for Germany